Drop Tower, formerly known as Drop Zone: Stunt Tower, is the name of five drop tower amusement rides located at Cedar Fair amusement parks in the United States and Canada. Each installation varies in size and capacity.

History
Prior to their acquisition by Cedar Fair, the five parks owned by Paramount Parks featured a drop tower ride named Drop Zone: Stunt Tower, in reference to the Paramount film of the same name. All were built by Swiss ride manufacturer Intamin, which consist of either Gyro Drop or Giant Drop models. Martin & Vleminckx constructed the Intamin-built Drop Tower at California's Great America. With the exception of both Kings Dominion's and Canada's Wonderland's towers, they are located in their park's various backlot themed areas. When Paramount owned and operated the parks, stunt performers performed an action scene periodically near the attraction depicting a performer falling from a platform.

In 2006, Paramount Parks sold their amusement parks to Cedar Fair, which was followed by the removal of Paramount branding from each park. All five attractions were renamed Drop Tower: Scream Zone (commonly shortened to Drop Tower), and the swirl logos associated with each were removed from the rides' signage.

A serious incident occurred on Superman: Tower of Power at Six Flags Kentucky Kingdom, in which a rider's feet were severed by a loose cable, prompting each park to temporarily close their drop tower installation. They were closed as a precaution for several weeks and inspected, then eventually reopened.

Ride experience

Giant Drop

The three original drop towers, opening in 1996 and 1997 at Carowinds, California's Great America, and Canada's Wonderland are Giant Drop models. They feature either four, five or six cars fitting four people on each one.

All three are painted in rainbow colors with race track decals. In 2019, Drop Tower at California's Great America was given a brown and green tree-like paint scheme, paying homage to Northern California forests.

Gyro Drop
Both the Kings Island and Kings Dominion ride claim to be the tallest Gyro Drop towers in the world. Kings Island's tower is measured as the tallest in the world, while Kings Dominion's tower utilizes brakes positioned closer to the ground, producing a longer drop than the tower at Kings Island.

Locations

 *''Drop height is only the space between the top of the tower and the braking, what is considered the "freefall" section.

Incidents

 On August 22, 1999, a 12-year-old boy was killed after falling from the Drop Tower installation at California's Great America. His family claimed the harness was not locked properly and he had a mental disability. An investigation was inconclusive and no charges were filed. Following the incident, the rest of the Drop Tower locations were shut down for inspections.

Records
California Great America's installation was the tallest vertical drop amusement park ride when it opened in 1996.

References

External links

 Official page at Canada's Wonderland
 Official page at Carowinds
 Official page at Kings Dominion
 Official page at Kings Island

Drop tower rides
California's Great America
Carowinds
Amusement rides manufactured by Intamin
Amusement rides introduced in 1996
Amusement rides introduced in 1997
Amusement rides introduced in 1999
Amusement rides introduced in 2003
Cedar Fair attractions
Canada's Wonderland
Kings Island
Kings Dominion